Dawlish Town A.F.C. was a football club based in Dawlish, Devon, England.  The club played in the Western League Premier Division. In March 2008, the club entered into a partnership with Newton Abbot to share administrative resources, although the playing staff remained separate.

In October 2003, Chris Myers took over as manager. Dawlish Town were relegated at the end of the season. They finished in 4th place the next season, but in the 2005/06 season, they were promoted as First Division Champions. The 2006/07 season saw Dawlish Town consolidate in the Premier League of the Toolstation Western League with a 10th-place finish. The 2007/08 season saw Dawlish Town achieve a 2nd place finish and two major cup wins in the Les Phillips Cup and the Devon St. Luke's Cup. On 8 June, manager Chris Myers resigned to move to the Northwest of England.

The club has since reformed in 2016 as AFC Dawlish Town and plays their matches at the Dawlish Leisure Centre Cage Ground.

Club history

Dawlish Town Association Football Club was formed in 1889. The original name was Dawlish Argyle, but the Argyle was dropped many years ago. The name ‘Town’ was added in recent years in order to distinguish the club from other local teams. In the early years, the club played at two different locations before moving to its present-day site, now known as Sandy Lane, midway through the 20th century.

Originally, there was only one team, but the club added another side around the same time as they moved to Sandy Lane. By 1950, Dawlish introduced a third team into Junior Football. The success of the junior side was not far away, with the team winning their Junior 3B League in season 1953–54 with a 100% record and the League Cup as well.

One of the earliest recorded honours occurred in season 1931–32 when the club lifted the East Devon Senior Cup. In 1960, Dawlish played a Torquay-based side for what transpired to be for the title of "East Devon Champions". Dawlish won the game 3 – 0 and was duly recognized as East Devon Champions.

Dawlish Town's best-performing season was in 1972–73. There were only two sides at this time, but both sides won every competition they entered. The first team won the following: Exeter & District Premier League; Devon Premier Cup; East Devon Senior Cup; Sellick Memorial Cup; Rothmans Invitation Trophy. The second team won the following: Exeter & District Senior League; Geary Cup.

After such success, the club decided that the first team should join the Western League in season 1973–74, with the second team moving up to the Devon & Exeter Premier Division. At this time, the town of Dawlish had two other senior Saturday sides playing under the banner of AL Dawlish. An agreement was made that AL Dawlish would join Dawlish Town, and with two Sunday senior teams running from 1983 to 1990, the senior playing strength of the club was considerable. In the 1970s, Dawlish ran a Youth team with their first honours being the Bevin Trophy at Under 15 level in season 1973–74 and the Devon Youth Cup at Under 18 level in season 1975–76. A full Youth Section was formed in 1983, and under its separate committee, five teams represented the club in various age groups. 1989 was one of their best years, with the Under 14s not only winning their league, but also their League Cup final at Torquay United's Plainmoor ground. Youth football continues to flourish within the town and is under the banner of Dawlish United Youth & Mini Soccer.

In 1988–89, Dawlish's third team won the Devon & Exeter League Senior Division 3, remaining unbeaten for the entire season and only dropping 3 points.

As a requirement of Western League football, Dawlish Town installed floodlights on their ground in 1987. The ground was officially opened February 9, 1987, celebrated when Queens Park Rangers brought their full squad to play the 1st team. At the beginning of the 1987–88 season, Dawlish played host to Aberdeen, and in season 1988–89, both Chelsea and Watford visited Dawlish. Chelsea, in fact, played twice at Dawlish, playing Torquay United in a pre-season friendly as Torquay United's ground was not ready to host pre-season friendlies. Dawlish has also played Crewe Alexandra on several occasions, having established a close relationship with their manager Dario Gradi. It was Dario Gradi who spotted the talents of a Dawlish Youth player Seth Johnson, and for those who do not know – Seth Johnson not only played for Crewe Alexandra, but went on to play for Derby County and Leeds United as well as becoming a full England international. As part of the Western League development standards, Dawlish built new changing rooms in readiness for the 1989–90 season. Since this time, Dawlish has hosted many football league teams, including Burnley, Lincoln, Leyton Orient, Bury, Bristol City, Huddersfield Town, Sheffield Wednesday, and Wimbledon, as well as our local senior teams Plymouth Argyle, Torquay United, and Exeter City. Not every club in the country can say that one of their teams has played at Wembley Stadium even once, let alone twice! But in May 1996, Dawlish Town won the inaugural Carlsberg Pub Cup Final, with Wembley Stadium hosting the final. Dawlish Town won the cup 4 – 2 on penalties, with the undoubted hero being Dawlish Town's goalkeeper Jamie Day who saved two penalties. Dawlish had also won their semi-final at Anfield by two goals to nil. The second visit to Wembley was on 22 September 1996 when Dawlish played the Dutch Carlsberg Champions Brigade Bodega in a first ever Carlsberg European Pub Cup Championship. On this occasion, Dawlish lost 1 – 0 after conceding a late goal.
In season 1999–00, Dawlish regained their Western League Premier Division place after finishing as runners-up in Division One. Due to some fantastic support from second team players under the guidance of Dave Cleave and Ray Green, and wonderful support from Dawlish United Under 16s, Dawlish was able to endure a difficult period in its history at this time. Season 2002–03 also saw the introduction of a Ladies' team who, in their first season, secured the third position in the Devon League First Division. Season 2003–04 saw the club re-enter a third team in the Devon & Exeter League Intermediate Division Three, and they immediately gained promotion to Intermediate III, which sadly saw the first team relegated back to the Western League Division One and the second team to Devon & Exeter Senior Division Two.

At around 04:00 hrs on the 5 August 2004, the club was hit by another devastating blow when their wooden stand (built in 1942), and which had witnessed so much of the history of the club, was completely destroyed by fire.

Season 2004–05 saw the first and second teams establish their league positions. The third team, however, continued to flourish under manager Tim Bradshaw and secured promotion to Devon & Exeter League Intermediate Division Two. Season 2005–06 was a resounding success for the 1st team. Promotion to the Western League Premier Division was secured as champions, with Carl Cliff-Brown being the top goal scorer for the entire League. The 2nd team were placed in Devon & Exeter League Division Senior 3 after a league re-organization, and they just missed out on promotion.

Yet again, the third team enjoyed another promotion year, this time finishing as runners-up to secure their position in Intermediate I for 2006–07. At the beginning of the season, 2006–07, Dawlish Town played a pre-season friendly with Torquay United. Torquay United Chairman Mike Bateson, Dawlish Town's Managing Director Terence Stone, and chairman and Director Dave Fenner marked the occasion by officially opening their new grandstand. In recognition of outstanding support given to the club by Terence Stone, the grandstand was named the "Terence Stone Stand".

Season 2006–07 saw the first team consolidate themselves in the Premier Division of the Western League and the Reserves finishing runners up in  the Devon and Exeter Football League Senior Division Three.

Season 2007–08 was outstanding with the First Team winning two cups – the Les Phillips Cup and the Devon St. Luke's Bowl – and finishing in their highest ever league position – Western League Premier Division runner-up.

Season 2008–09 was the end of an era for manager Chris Myers but saw the first team have an unbeaten start to the season under new manager Adam Kerswell until eventually losing his job to see Adam Shearer return to the club where they finished third in the league. Striker Joe Bushin hit 39 goals to be the league top scorer.

Season 2009–10 saw Ex. Barnstaple Manager Jeff Evans take over the managerial role of the club with Chris Porter, his assistant. Chris is known for taking the Torquay Boys Grammar School to the national cup final held at Manchester City's City of Manchester ground and won the cup. Season 09/10 saw the departure of striker Joe Bushin, who joined Tiverton Town. Since then, the two have worked to bring in many new faces at the club. The club reached the FA Vase 5th, being defeated by Gresley Town in a replay at the Moat Ground after two battling legs of football.

The 2010/11 Season saw Adam Kerswell take over again, but he lasted no longer than a month before Captain Gary Fisher was given the role of player/manager. March 2011 saw Dave Fenner step down as chairman to concentrate on his work commitments. Fisher's managerial campaign proved to be a success, seeing Dawlish rise from a 15th to 6th in the league table. With Jules Ematti-Ematti and Joe Bushin leaving the club to pursue careers at a higher level, a new-look Dawlish team, including the likes of Karl Baker, Liam McAuley, Clay Bond, Alex Narramore and manager Gary Fisher competed in the club's final season.

Dawlish Town quit the Western League on 23 July 2011.

they don't play in the western league because they quit on july 23rd 2011

Honours

Western League
Premier Division runner-up – 2007–08
Amateur Trophy Winners – 1976–77
Challenge Cup Winners – 1980–81, 1983–84
Division One Champions – 2005–06
Division One Runners-up – 1998–99

Exeter & District League
Premier Division Champions – 1966–67, 1968–69, 1969–70, 1971–72, 1972–73
Senior Three Champions 2000–2001

Cups
Devon Senior Cup Winners – 1957–58, 1967–68
Devon Premier Cup Winners – 1969–70, 1972–73, 1980–81
St Luke's Bowl 1982–83, 2007–08
Carlsberg Pub Cup Winners 1995–96
Les Phillips Cup Winners 2007–08
FA Vase Quarter Finalists 2009–10

Former players
1. Players that have played/managed in the Football League or any foreign equivalent to this level (i.e. fully professional league).
2. Players with full international caps.
3. Players that hold a club record or have captained the club.
 Paul McCullough

References

External links
 Official Club Website
 Site for supporters
 Pitchero article on Dawlish Town quitting the Western League, July 23rd 2011

Defunct football clubs in Devon
Western Football League
1899 establishments in England
Association football clubs established in 1899
Defunct football clubs in England
Dawlish
Association football clubs disestablished in 2011